Bunnahabhain distillery was founded in 1881 near Port Askaig on Islay. The village of Bunnahabhain was founded to house its workers.

History
The Bunnahabhain is one of the milder single malt Islay whiskies available and its taste varies greatly from other spirits to be found on the island of Islay, off the west coast of Scotland.

Initially the distillery was owned by the Islay Distillery Company, but in 1887 it was taken over by the Highland Distilleries Company.

Originally it was supplied by ship, but in 1960 a road was built to the distillery. The last delivery by ship was in 1993. It closed in 1981 but was opened in 1984 when demand picked up.  In 2003 it was acquired by Burn Stewart which merged with Distell in 2014 and is one of ten active distilleries on the island.

The name Bunnahabhain is an anglicisation of Bun na h-Abhainne, Scottish Gaelic for Mouth of the River.

Managers
James Falconer from 1902  (formerly manager of the Scapa distillery)
Bob Gordon - late 1970s
Douglas Eccles - there in 1985
Sandy Lawtie - 1985 - 1989
Hamish Proctor - 1989 - 1998
John MacLellan - 1998 - 2009
Andrew Brown - 2011–present

Products

Core products as of 2022 include:

Bunnahabhain 12 Year Old ABV 46.3% 
Bunnahabhain 18 Year Old ABV 46.3% 
Bunnahabhain 25 Year Old ABV 46.3% 
Bunnahabhain 30 Year Old ABV 46.3% 
Bunnahabhain 40 Year Old ABV 41.9% 
Stiuireadair ABV 46.3% 
Toiteach A Dhà ABV 46.3%

There are several independent bottler releases from these brands, including That Boutique-y Whisky Company, Douglas Laing & Co, and Duncan Taylor.

See also
 List of distilleries in Scotland

References

External links

Bunnahabhain official website
Black Bottle official website

Distilleries in Scotland
Whisky distilleries in Islay
Food and drink companies established in 1881